Edwin Amos "Mike" Harris (August 15, 1921 – August 29, 2007) was an American football player who played at the guard position on both offense and defense. He played college football for Mississippi State in 1942, 1945, and 1946, and professional football for the Brooklyn Dodgers in 1947 and 1948.

Early years
Harris was born in 1921 and attended the Gulf Coast Military Academy in Gulfport, Mississippi.

College football and military service
Harris played one season of college football at Mississippi State in 1942 before being called into military service during World War II. After the war, he returned to Mississippi State for the 1945 and 1946 seasons. He was named to the All-Southwestern Conference football team in 1946.

Professional football
He was selected by the New York Giants in the ninth round (75th overall pick) of the 1946 NFL Draft but did not play for the Giants. He played professional football in the All-America Football Conference (AAFC) for the Brooklyn Dodgers during their 1947 and 1948 seasons. He appeared in 27 or 28 games with the Dodgers.

Later years
He died in 2007 at age 86.

References

1921 births
2007 deaths
Brooklyn Dodgers (AAFC) players
Mississippi State Bulldogs football players
Players of American football from Mississippi